The Central Station (in Spanish: Estación Central) was a railway station in the city of Buenos Aires, Argentina, which operated from 1872 to 1897.

The station was a union station of Buenos Aires shared by most of the separate railway companies existing by then, and functioned as terminus of most of the railway lines thus allowing passengers to connect conveniently between them. It was built in 1872 and located by what was then the shores of the Rio de la Plata next to the current Casa Rosada. The station building was a wood structure built in Great Britain, that had a slate mansard roof and a little tower with a clock and a dome on the top. When the Puerto Madero was inaugurated in 1897, the railway tracks of the Central Station blocked the access from the city to the port, and after a fire in 1897 use of the station was abandoned.

History

Background

From the 1850s onwards, railway lines began to connect the city of Buenos Aires with the surrounding cities and ports. All the diffent British railway companies then operating in Argentina initially opened each their own railway station as the terminals of their railway lines originating in Buenos Aires. Eventually, however they managed to reach an agreement to share a joint station, thus allowing passengers to connect conveniently between them. By August 1872 all the railway companies operating in the city signed the agreement for a common use of the Central Station, which until then had been owned by Buenos Aires and Ensenada Port Railway (BA&EP).

The new station was inaugurated on 12 August 1872 in a ceremony attended by the President of Argentina Domingo Faustino Sarmiento. The use of the station was shared by five railway companies, the Buenos Aires and Ensenada Port Railway (BA&EP), the Buenos Aires Western Railway (BAWR), the Buenos Aires and Pacific Railway (BA&P), the Buenos Aires and Rosario Railway (BA&R), the Buenos Aires Northern Railway (BANR) and the Central Argentine Railway (CA).

The Central Station was located by the Rio de la Plata, next to the current Casa Rosada on the corner of Paseo de Julio Avenue (currently Avenida Leandro N. Alem) and Piedad street (today Bartolomé Mitre), between Paseo de Julio and the wall that protected the riverbank. Trains arrived from the South by means of an iron viaduct on tall columns, that extended from Casa Amarilla station to Victoria street (the current Hipólito Yrigoyen street). The route of the viaduct would later be used to build the Paseo Colón Avenue.

To allow for access to the Central Station, on 1 October 1872 the Buenos Aires Great Southern Railway (BAGS) also opened a short connecting branch line from Barracas al Norte station (the current Hipólito Yrigoyen railway station) to Tres Esquinas railway station on the Buenos Aires and Ensenada Port Railway (BA&EP).

The station

When the Central Station was opened, the tracks ran from north to south directly alongside what was then the shores of the Río de la Plata. The Taylor Customs House with its loading bay was located in the south end of the station, and at the north end was the entrance to the passenger pier.

The modern station building, built in wood, was brought from Great Britain by entrepreneur William Wheelwright, although it had originally been intended to be used in India (then a British colony). It had a slate mansard roof and a little tower with a clock and a dome on the top. The station had a platform over the main track and other two. Its structure also included two coffeehouses and two ladies rooms. 

The Central Station served as terminus not only for BA & Ensenada but for other railways such as BA Western, BA & Rosario and BA & Northern.

Closure

A sudden economic and population boom led the new President of Argentina, Julio Roca, to commission the development in 1881 of an ambitious port to supplement the recently developed facilities at La Boca, in Buenos Aires' southside. The project required the reclaiming of over 200 hectares (500 acres) of underwater land from the Rio de la Plata off the station. When the Puerto Madero was inaugurated in 1897, the railway tracks blocked the lands and the access from the city to the port of Buenos Aires, therefore many people opposed the railway transit across the city of Buenos Aires. During the 1890s the National Government considered moving the Central Station to the Puerto Madero, although it was never carried out.

On February 14, 1897, the station was completely destroyed by fire. The next day, the company built some wood shacks to sell tickets as a replacement of the destroyed station, but they were removed by the Government of the city. On March 19 the National Government ordered to remove all tracks from Casa Amarilla to Retiro, also forbidding Central Station was reconstructed. Finally, on July 1, the line was closed.

As a result, the railway companies existing by then (BA & Rosario, Central Argentine and BA & Pacific) had to leave the place, moving to Retiro station, where they have remained until present days. BA&E established Venezuela station as terminus, although shortly after it was moved to Casa Amarilla.

References

Bibliography

External links

Railway stations in Buenos Aires
Railway stations opened in 1872
Railway stations closed in 1897
Defunct railway stations in Argentina